Trisodium borate is a chemical compound of sodium, boron, and oxygen, with formula , or . It is a sodium salt of the orthoboric acid .

The compound is also called trisodium orthoborate, sodium orthoborate, or just sodium borate. However, "sodium orthoborate" has been used also for a compound with formula , which would correspond to an equimolar mixture of sodium metaborate  and trisodium borate proper. and "sodium borate" is sometimes used in the generic sense, for a sodium salt with any of several other borate anions.

Preparation

Sodium carbonate  will react with sodium metaborate  or boric oxide  to form the orthoborate and carbon dioxide when heated between 600 and 850 °C:

Difficult to obtain in pure form from melts.

Properties

Reactions

When dissolved in water, the orthoborate anion partially hydrolyzes into metaborate  and hydroxide :

Electrolysis of a solution of sodium orthoborate generates sodium perborate at the anode.

References

Chemical compounds